Werhof v Freeway Traffic Systems GmbH & Co KG (2006) C-499/04 is a European labour law case concerning the minimum floor of requirements in the European Union for the enforceability of a collective agreement after a transfer of a business.

Facts
Mr Werhof claimed that he should get the benefit of a 2.6% wage increase under a 2002 collective agreement between IG Metall and AGV, the Nordrhein-Westfalen Metal and Electricity Federation from Freeway KG, his employer since 1999. Freeway was not a member of AGV, and in 2001 had got Mr Werhof to sign an agreement waiving all individual employment rights to wage increases that he could claim under the prior collective agreement in return for a one off wage payment under a new collective agreement with their present workforce. Freeway KG had previously been DUEWAG AG, which was transferred to Siemens and then became separate, though DUEWAG AG had been a party to the industry collective agreement of AGV. Mr Werhof claimed that he was entitled to the wage increases as updated in the collective agreement, which had transferred to his new employer under the Bürgerliches Gesetzbuch §613a(1), or alternatively under the EU Business Transfers Directive.

Judgment

Landesarbeitsgericht
The Landesarbeitsgericht Düsseldorf held that under BGB §613a(1), which was meant to implement art 3, it was settled law that Werhof had no claim, but referred to the ECJ whether this was compatible with minimum standards of the Business Transfers Directive article 3.

European Court of Justice
The ECJ held that where a contract of employment refers to a collective agreement that is binding on a transferor, the transferee, who is not party to it, is not bound by collective agreements subsequent to the one in force at the time of the transfer. It noted that freedom of contract implies that two parties cannot impose obligations on third parties without their consent, but the BTD 2001 infringes that principle to protect employees. It emphasised that this view would be compatible with the principle of freedom of association.

See also
Parkwood-Leisure Ltd v Alemo-Herron [2010] EWCA Civ 24
Howard Johnson Co v Detroit Local Joint Executive Board, 417 US 249 (1974)
Whent v T Cartledge Ltd [1997] IRLR 153, Hicks J held that there was no reason why an employer could not bind itself to a collective agreement which was constantly updated.

Notes

References

German case law
Court of Justice of the European Union case law
2006 in Germany
European Union labour case law
2006 in European Union case law